Ivan Babić (Serbian Cyrillic: Иван Бабић; born 2 January 1981 in Novo Selo) is a Serbian former football defender.

Career

Club career
Babić made his debut for Borac Čačak in 1999, before moving to Napredak Kruševac in 2000. In June 2004, Babić signed a deal with Partizan. He played on loan at Obilić, Rad and Bežanija. He returned to Napredak Kruševac in the 2007–08 season. After three seasons, Babić moved to Novi Pazar in the summer of 2010. He scored first Serbian SuperLiga goal in the club's history for a 1–0 win against Smederevo.

Coaching career
After having working as U19 head coach for his former club FK Napredak Kruševac, Babić was promoted as assistant coach for the club's first team in December 2019 under his former teammate and newly appointed head coach Ivan Stefanović.

References

External links
 Utakmica profile
 Srbijafudbal profile
 

1981 births
Living people
Serbian footballers
Association football defenders
FK Borac Čačak players
FK Napredak Kruševac players
FK Partizan players
FK Obilić players
FK Rad players
FK Bežanija players
FK Novi Pazar players
FK Metalac Gornji Milanovac players
FK Sloga Kraljevo players
SC Tavriya Simferopol players
Serbian First League players
Serbian SuperLiga players
Serbian expatriate footballers
Expatriate footballers in Ukraine
Serbian expatriate sportspeople in Ukraine